The 1998 San Jose mayoral election was held on June 2 and November 3, 1998 to elect the Mayor of San Jose, California. It saw the election of Ron Gonzales.

Incumbent mayor Susan Hammer was term limited.

Because no candidate managed to receive a majority of the vote in the initial round of the election, a runoff election was held between the first round's top-two finishers.

Candidates
Advanced to runoff
Patricia Dando, San Jose city councilor
Ron Gonzales, Santa Clara County supervisor

Eliminated in first round
Bill Chew, candidate for mayor in 1990 and 1994
Kathy Napoli, businesswoman

Results

First round

References

San Jose
San Jose
1998